Springville, Indiana may refer to:

Springville, Clark County, Indiana
Springville, LaPorte County, Indiana
Springville, Lawrence County, Indiana